Cryptodifflugiidae is a family of arcellinid testate amoebae.

Description
Members of this family are conopodous (with conical pseudopods) amoebae with the body in a clear, usually firm, vase-shaped test, and conical pseudopods for locomotion that extend separately from the opening of the test.

Classification
The classification of the family, as of 2019:
 Infraorder Phryganellina Bovee 1985
 Family Cryptodifflugiidae Penard 1890
Cryptodifflugia Cash 1904 – 23 species
 Meisterfeldia Bobrov 2016 – 6 species
 Wailesella Deflandre 1928 – 1 species
The 2022 classification places Meisterfeldia and Wailesella as Arcellinida incertae sedis, leaving Cryptodifflugia as the sole member of the family.

References

Amoebozoa families
Tubulinea